Matt Lenski is an American director of television commercials, music videos, and films. He is based in New York City. Lenski won an MTV Video Music Award for his direction of Fall Out Boy's "Sugar, We're Goin' Down" video. His short film  Meaning Of Robots was officially accepted in the 2012 Sundance Film Festival.

Lenski's 2004 viral campaign, "F*ck New York," parodied the Republican Presidential Convention, which took place in New York City. The satire featured thug teens playing the roles of President George W. Bush and his political bedfellows. New York Magazine quoted it as Russell Simmons' preferred viral video.

Music videos
Get Busy Committee "I Don't Care About You" (2010)
Hal Linton "Mind Control" (2010)
Fall Out Boy "Sugar, We're Goin' Down" (hi-fi version) (2005)
Rogue Wave "Publish My Love" (2006)
The Giraffes "Having Fun" (2006)
CKY "Familiar Realm" (2006)
Band of Horses "The Funeral" (2006) (using footage directed by his father, Willy Lenski)
Zero 7 feat. Sia "Throw It All Away" (2006)
Regina Spektor "On the Radio" (version 1) (2006)
Mark Ronson feat. Daniel Merriweather "Stop Me" (US / international version) (2007)
Orson "Ain't No Party" (2007)

Short films
 Filibuster Premiered at the film festival, Rooftop Films
 Meaning of Robots Premiered at Sundance Film Festival
 F*ck New York

References
Notes

Bibliography
 The Guys Behind The "F*** New York" Video

External links
 Supply&Demand Integrated
 

American music video directors
Film directors from New York City
Living people
Year of birth missing (living people)